Nandyal Lok Sabha constituency is one of the twenty-five lok sabha constituencies of Andhra Pradesh in India. It comprises seven assembly segments and belongs to Nandyal district.

This seat has been represented in Lok Sabha by Neelam Sanjiva Reddy, just before he became president in 1977, and by P.V. Narasimha Rao, just after he became Prime Minister in 1991.

Vidhan Sabha segments
Nandyal Lok Sabha constituency presently comprises the following Legislative Assembly segments:

Members of Lok Sabha

^ by poll

Election results

General Election 1989

General Election 1991

Bye-Election 1991

General Election 1996

Bye-Election 1996

General Election 1998

General Election 1999

General Election 2004

General Election 2009

General Election 2014

General Election 2019

See also 
 List of constituencies of the Andhra Pradesh Legislative Assembly

References

External links
 Nandyal lok sabha constituency election 2019 date and schedule

Kurnool district
Lok Sabha constituencies in Andhra Pradesh